Indian Hill is a railroad station in the southernmost portion of Winnetka, Illinois, an affluent suburb north of Chicago. One of three stations serving that village, the Indian Hill stop is served by Metra's Union Pacific North Line trains, with service to Ogilvie Transportation Center in downtown Chicago. Northbound trains go as far as Kenosha, Wisconsin. In Metra's zone-based fare schedule, Indian Hill is in zone D. As of 2018, Indian Hill is the 125th busiest of Metra's 236 non-downtown stations, with an average of 387 weekday boardings.

The station is located on Winnetka's southern border, at Green Bay Road and Winnetka Avenue, less than a mile west of Lake Michigan. Outbound trains stop on the west platform, and inbound trains stop on the east platform. Indian Hill lacks a ticket agent office, passengers boarding must buy their tickets on board the train. Travel time to Ogilvie ranges from 31 minutes to 39 minutes, depending on the train.

As of December 5, 2022, Indian Hill is served by 57 trains (29 inbound and 28 outbound) on weekdays, by 11 trains in each direction on Saturdays, and by eight trains in each direction on Sundays.

Indian Hill is at the southern end of what is known as "The Big Ditch", which carries the railroad under Winnetka. Before the early 1940s, Winnetka had grade crossings, where accidents caused 31 deaths between 1912 and 1937. The village, federal government and railroad authorities funded a five-year project to rebuild the railroad below grade, and this was completed in 1943, after which there were no more level crossings in Winnetka.

Bus connections
Pace
  213 Green Bay Road

References

External links
Metra - Indian Hill
Winnetka Historical Society - The Big Ditch
Winnetka Road entrance from Google Maps Street View

Metra stations in Illinois
Former Chicago and North Western Railway stations
Winnetka, Illinois
Railway stations in Cook County, Illinois
Union Pacific North Line